Richard Blahut (born June 9, 1937), former chair of the Electrical and Computer Engineering Department at the University of Illinois at Urbana–Champaign, is best known for his work in information theory (e.g. the Blahut–Arimoto algorithm used in rate–distortion theory). He received his PhD Electrical Engineering from Cornell University in 1972.

Blahut was elected a member of the National Academy of Engineering in 1990 for pioneering work in coherent emitter signal processing and for contributions to information theory and error control codes.

Academic life
Blahut taught at Cornell from 1973 to 1994. He has taught at Princeton University, the Swiss Federal Institute of Technology, the NATO Advanced Study Institute, and has also been a Consulting Professor at the South China University of Technology. He is also the Henryk Magnuski Professor of Electrical and Computer Engineering and is affiliated with the Coordinated Science Laboratory.

Awards and recognition

 IEEE Claude E. Shannon Award, 2005
 IEEE Third Millennium Medal
 TBP Daniel C. Drucker Eminent Faculty Award 2000
 IEEE Alexander Graham Bell Medal 1998, for "contributions to error-control coding, particularly by combining algebraic coding theory and digital transform techniques."
 National Academy of Engineering 1990
 Japanese Society for the Propagation of Science Fellowship 1982
 Fellow of Institute of Electrical and Electronics Engineers, 1981
 Fellow of IBM Corporation, 1980
 IBM Corporate Recognition Award 1979
 IBM Outstanding Innovation Award 1978
 IBM Outstanding Contribution Award 1976
 IBM Resident Study Program 1969–1971
 IBM Outstanding Contribution Award 1968

Books
 Lightwave Communications, with George C. Papen (Cambridge University Press, 2019) 
 Cryptography and Secure Communication, (Cambridge University Press, 2014) 
 Modem Theory: An Introduction to Telecommunications, (Cambridge University Press, 2010) 
 Fast Algorithms for Signal Processing, (Cambridge University Press, 2010) 
 Algebraic Codes on Lines, Planes, and Curves: An Engineering Approach, (Cambridge University Press, 2008) 
 Theory of Remote Image Formation, (Cambridge University Press, 2004) 
 Algebraic Codes for Data Transmission, (Cambridge University Press, 2003) 
 Algebraic Methods for Signal Processing and Communications Coding, (Springer-Verlag, 1992) 
 Digital Transmission of Information, (Addison–Wesley Press, 1990) 
 Fast Algorithms for Digital Signal Processing, (Addison–Wesley Press, 1985) 
 Theory and Practice of Error Control Codes, (Addison–Wesley Press, 1983)

See also
 IEEE Biography
 ECE @ UIUC

References

External links
 

Living people
1937 births
Members of the United States National Academy of Engineering
Fellows of the American Association for the Advancement of Science
University of Illinois Urbana-Champaign faculty
Cornell University faculty
Cornell University College of Engineering alumni
American electrical engineers
Fellow Members of the IEEE
American telecommunications engineers